Paul Piccone (January 17, 1940 – July 12, 2004) was an Italian-American philosopher, critical theorist, intellectual historian, and most notably the founder and long-time editor of the journal Telos.

He was born in L'Aquila in Italy to a family that emigrated to Rochester, New York in the mid-1950s. In 1968, he and others started the journal Telos, which he edited until his death in 2004. 

He completed a doctorate in philosophy at University at Buffalo in 1970. He then taught at Washington University in St. Louis until 1977.

Life 
Piccone was born in L'Aquila, Italy on January 17, 1940. He immigrated to the United States with his family at age 14, and they settled in Rochester, New York. After undergraduate studies at Indiana University, he did his doctoral work in philosophy at SUNY-Buffalo where he received his Ph.D. in 1970. He was appointed to a position in the Department of Sociology at Washington University in St. Louis, and published Telos from his office there until he was denied promotion and tenure in 1977. Following a tumultuous administrative and legal struggle to reverse that decision, he left the Midwest to set up shop in New York's East Village in the 1980s.

Telos 
For over three decades, Telos survived as an independent "quarterly journal of critical thought" under his editorship. However during the 1980’s the journal gave up its left political orientation.

Death 
Not long after turning 60, Piccone contracted a rare form of cancer during 2000. He battled it successfully for many long months, but on July 12, 2004, he died at age 64.

Bibliography

Books 
 TELOS: A Journal of Critical Theory, Paul Piccone, ed., nos. 1-127.
 Towards a New Marxism, Paul Piccone and Bart Grahl, eds. (St. Louis, MO: Telos Press, 1973).
 Italian Marxism, Paul Piccone (Berkeley: University of California Press, 1983).
 Confronting the Crisis: Writings of Paul Piccone, Paul Piccone, ed. and intro. by Gary Ulmen (New York: Telos Press, 2008).

See also 
 Telos Institute

References

External links 
 www.telospress.com - Official website of Telos Press, publishers of TELOS
 Timothy W. Luke, "The Trek with Telos: A Rememberance (sic) of Paul Piccone", Fast Capitalism 1.2 (2005).
 "Paul Piccone," Manhattan, Inc., July 1990.
 Russell Jacoby, "Paul Piccone: Outside Academe," Chronicle of Higher Education, June 13, 2008.
 Collin May, C2C: Canada's Journal of Ideas, vol. 2, no. 1 (2008): 49-54.

1940 births
2004 deaths
Italian emigrants to the United States
American Marxists
American political philosophers
Critical theorists
Intellectual historians
University at Buffalo alumni
Washington University in St. Louis faculty
Indiana University alumni